James Thomas Stewart-Murray, 9th Duke of Atholl, 14th Baron Strange, 8th Baron Percy (18 August 1879 – 8 May 1957), styled Lord James Stewart-Murray until 1942, was a Scottish peer and soldier.

Stewart-Murray was the fourth and youngest son of John Stewart-Murray, 7th Duke of Atholl, and Louisa Moncreiffe, daughter of Thomas Moncreiffe of that Ilk, 7th Baronet. He was educated at Eton and commissioned a second lieutenant in the 1st Battalion of the Queen's Own Cameron Highlanders on 3 January 1900. The following month, he left for South Africa to fight in the Second Boer War, where he was mentioned in dispatches and won two medals and six clasps. He later fought in the First World War, where he was wounded, captured, and held as a Prisoner of War, and resigned from the army as a major. He became a Freemason in Lodge St. John, No. 14 (now the United Lodge of Dunkeld) at the same time as his elder brother George in 1914. In 1942, aged 62, he succeeded his elder brother John Stewart-Murray, 8th Duke of Atholl in the dukedom.

Atholl died unmarried in May 1957, aged 77. On his death, the barony of Strange fell into abeyance while the barony of Percy was passed on to his kinsman Hugh Percy, 10th Duke of Northumberland. The baronies of Murray and Glenlyon and earldom of Strange became extinct. He was succeeded in the dukedom of Atholl and in other Scottish titles by a distant relative, Iain Murray, 10th Duke of Atholl, his fourth cousin twice removed, who was descended from George Murray, Bishop of St David's, second son of the eighteenth century 3rd Duke.

References

External links

|-

1879 births
1957 deaths
109
James
Queen's Own Cameron Highlanders officers
People educated at Eton College
British Army personnel of World War I
British Army personnel of the Second Boer War
British World War I prisoners of war
Dukes of Rannoch
Barons Strange